Ilah is the nom de plume of Inge Liesbeth Alfonsina Heremans (Leuven, 25 January 1971), a Belgian comic book artist, mainly known for her Cordelia series, a gag-a-day comic about a young woman, which has gained popularity and notoriety for openly but tastefully dealing with themes like sex and masturbation. Ilah is also a prominent illustrator of advertisements for the Antwerp book festival De Boekenbeurs and the bus company De Lijn.

Biography

She studied applied graphics at the LUCA School of Arts in Brussels and then received a master's degree in philosophy from the Catholic University in Leuven. The Cordelia series, which she developed in 1996, appears in the newspaper De Morgen. Several collections of Cordelia strips have also been published. Another strip based on a character named Mira appears in  magazine.  Her work also appears in De Tijd, De Standaard, Focus Knack, Ad Valvas,  and GeenStijl.

References

External links
 Lambiek Comiclopedia article.

1971 births
Living people
20th-century Belgian women artists
21st-century Belgian women artists
Belgian comics artists
Belgian female comics artists
Female comics writers
Belgian illustrators
Belgian women illustrators
Belgian cartoonists
Belgian humorists
Artists from Leuven
KU Leuven alumni